There are many different ways to define financial stability. The absence of system-wide episodes in which a crisis occurs is central to financial stability, according to the majority of financial institutes. It also involves financial systems' stress-resilience. It is not created to prevent crisis or stop bad financial decisions. It is there to hold the economy together and keep the system running smoothly while such events are happening. 

The foundation of financial stability is the creation of a system that is able to function in both good and bad times and can absorb all of the positive and negative events that happen to the economy at any given time. It has nothing to do with preventing individuals or businesses from failing, losing money, or succeeding. It is merely assisting in the creation of conditions for the system's continued efficient operation in the face of such occurrences.

The economy is one that is constantly changing and expanding, and it is full of businesses that start, grow, and fail: routine activities of the business cycle. Financial markets and financial institutions are considered stable when they are able to provide households, communities, and businesses with the resources, services, and products they require to invest, grow, and participate in a well-functioning economy. Financial institutions include banks, savings and loans, and other financial product and service providers.

A financial system that meets the needs of typical families and businesses to borrow money to buy a house or car, save for retirement, or pay for college is considered to have financial stability. In a similar vein, businesses must take out loans in order to expand, construct factories, recruit new workers, and make payroll. A functioning financial system is needed for all of these things, and it works best when the majority of people don't even give it much thought. Businesses and consumers simply know that they will be able to obtain short-term loans to pay their employees or that they will be able to finance significant expenditures such as the construction of a factory.

The ability to efficiently allot resources, assess and manage financial risks, maintain employment levels close to the natural rate of the economy, and eliminate relative price movements of real or financial assets that will affect monetary stability or employment levels are all features of a financially stable system. Financial imbalances that arise naturally or as a result of significant adverse and unforeseen events are dissipated when a financial system is in a range of stability. When the system is stable, it will primarily absorb shocks through self-corrective mechanisms, preventing adverse events from disrupting the real economy or other financial systems. Because the majority of real-world transactions take place through the financial system, financial stability is absolutely necessary for economic expansion.

Empirical measures

Firm-level stability measures

The Altman's z‐score is extensively used in empirical research as a measure of firm-level stability for its high correlation with the probability of default. This measure contrasts buffers (capitalization and returns) with risk (volatility of returns) and has done well at predicting bankruptcies within two years. Despite development of alternative models to predict financial stability Altman's model remains the most widely used.

An alternate model used to measure institution-level stability is the Merton model (also called the asset value model). It evaluates a firm's ability to meet its financial obligations and gauges the overall possibility of default. In this model, an institution's equity is treated as a call option on its held assets, taking into account the volatility of those assets. Put-call parity is used to price the value of the implied “put” option, which represents the firm's credit risk. Ultimately, the model measures the value of the firm's assets (weighted for volatility) at the time that the debtholders exercises their “put option” by expecting repayment. Implicitly, the model defines default as when the value of a firm's liabilities exceeds that of its assets calculate the probability of credit default. In different iterations of the model, the asset/liability level could be set at different threshold levels.

In subsequent research, Merton's model has been modified to capture a wider array of financial activity using credit default swap data. For example, Moody's uses it in the KMV model both to calculate the probability of credit default and as part of their credit risk management system. The Distance to Default (DD) is another market-based measure of corporate default risk based on Merton's model. It measures both solvency risk and liquidity risk at the firm level.

Systemic stability measures

Unfortunately, there is not yet a singular, standardized model for assessing financial system stability and for examining policies.

To measure systemic stability, a number of studies attempt to aggregate firm-level stability measures (z-score and distance to default) into a system-wide evaluation of stability, either by taking a simple average or weighing each measure by the institution's relative size. However, these aggregate measures fail to account for correlated risks among financial institutions. In other words, the model fails to consider the inter-connectedness between institutions, and that one institution's failure can lead to a contagion.

The First-to-Default probability, or the probability of observing one default among a number of institutions, has been proposed as a measure of systemic risk for a group of large financial institutions. This measure looks at risk-neutral default probabilities from credit default swap spreads. Unlike distance-to-default measures, the probability recognizes the interconnectedness among defaults of different institutions. However, studies focusing on probabilities of default tend to overlook the ripper effect caused by the failing of a large institution.

Another assessment of financial system stability is Systemic Expected Shortfall (SES), which measures the contribution to systemic risk by individual institutions. SES considers individual leverage level and measures the externalities created from the banking sector when these institutions fail. The model is especially apt at identifying which institutions are systemically relevant and would impact the most on the economy when it fails. One drawback of the SES method is that it is difficult to determine when the systemically important institutions are likely to fail.

To enhance predictive power, the retrospective SES measure was extended and modified in later research. The enhanced model is called SRISK, which evaluates the expected capital shortfall for a firm in a crisis scenario. To calculate this SRISK, one should first determine the Long-Run Marginal Expected Shortfall (LRMES), which measures the relationship between a firm's equity returns and the market's return (estimated using asymmetric volatility, correlation, and copula). Then, the model estimates the drop in the firm's equity value if the aggregate market experiences a 40% or larger fall in a six-month period to determine how much capital is needed in order to achieve an 8% capital to asset value ratio. In other words, SRISK gives insights into the firm's percentage of total financial sector capital shortfall. A high SRISK % indicates the biggest losers when a crisis strikes. One implication of the SES indicator is that a firm is considered “systemically risky” if it faces a high probability of capital shortage when the financial sector is weak.

Another gauge of financial stability is the distribution of systemic loss, which attempts to fill some of the gaps of the aforementioned measures. This measure incorporates three key elements: each individual institution's probability of default, the size of loss given a default, and the contagion resulting from defaults interconnected institutions.

References

Finance